Squirrel-cage may refer to:

a squirrel-cage rotor
a squirrel-cage fan, another name for a centrifugal fan
a hamster wheel
"Squirrel Cage", a short story by Robert Sheckley
"The Squirrel Cage", a short story by Thomas M. Disch